Silvia Huntsman was an English squash player who won the British Open in 1923. She won the title by defeating her compatriot Nancy Cave in the final with a score of 6–15, 15–9, 17–15.

References

External links
Official British Open Squash Championships website
British Open historical data at Squashtalk.com

English female squash players
Year of death missing
Year of birth missing